The Tiloben Publishing Company is the largest Black-owned and operated communications company in the U.S. Pacific Northwest. Christopher Harold Bennet founded the company in 1970. By 1983, Bennet served as publisher of the Seattle Metro HomeMaker, the Seattle Medium, and the Tacoma True Citizen. He was elected to the board of the National Newspaper Publishers Association (NNPA) in 1981, and elected president in 1983. In 1987, he announced that the NNPA would boycott the state of Arizona, due to its cancelation of the Martin Luther King Jr. Day holiday; his term expired later that year. He later expressed optimism for collaboration among publishers of Black newspapers in the 1990s.

Bennett also owns Washington radio stations KRIZ 1420 AM and KYIZ 1620 AM and the Portland station KBMS 1480 AM.

The Seattle Metro Homemaker is a shopper's guide published in the Seattle-Tacoma area of the U.S. state of Washington. It has an approximate audience of 24,000 readers.

References 

Black-owned companies of the United States
Companies based in Seattle
Newspapers published in Seattle